Leporinus nattereri is a species of Leporinus found in the Rio Negro, Aleixo Lake, and the central Amazon basin in Brazil in South America.

Etymology
It is named in honor of Johann Natterer (1787-1843).

References

Géry, J., 1977. Characoids of the world. Neptune City ; Reigate : T.F.H. [etc.]; 672 p. : ill. (chiefly col.) ; 23 cm.

Taxa named by Franz Steindachner
Fish described in 1876
Anostomidae
Freshwater fish of Brazil